Clément Vidal (born 18 June 2000) is a French professional footballer who plays as a centre-back for  club Ajaccio.

Club career
Vidal played youth football for SC Orange. In November 2017, he signed a professional contract with Montpellier. He made his professional debut with the club on 4 December 2019 in a 2–2 draw away to Dijon.

On 1 July 2022, Vidal permanently signed for Ajaccio following a loan spell at the club.

References

External links
 
 
 

Living people
2000 births
Footballers from Montpellier
Association football central defenders
French footballers
France youth international footballers
Ligue 1 players
Ligue 2 players
Championnat National 2 players
Championnat National 3 players
Montpellier HSC players
AC Ajaccio players